Robberds is a surname. Notable people with the surname include: 

Dawn Robberds, Australian tennis player
John Gooch Robberds (1789–1854), English Unitarian minister
Lionel Robberds (born 1939), Australian coxswain, squash player, and barrister
Walter Robberds (1863-1944), Anglican bishop